Pasinato is an Italian surname. Notable people with the surname include:

Giancarlo Pasinato (born 1956), Italian footballer and manager
Mateus Pasinato (born 1992), Brazilian footballer
Michele Pasinato (1969–2021), Italian volleyball player

Italian-language surnames